Brindisi Airport , also known as Brindisi Papola Casale Airport and Salento Airport, is an airport in Brindisi, in southern Italy, located  from the city center.

History
This airport was originally established as a military airbase in the 1920s. The first commercial flights serving Rome began in the 1930s with the establishment of the Ala Littoria in 1934. After World War II, Alitalia took over the route and added a flight to Catania. As of 2008, it has officially changed its legal status into civilian airport, still maintaining operational the military facilities attached to it. These are identified with its original name "Military Airport Orazio Pierozzi", named in memory of an Italian airman of the First World War.

The airport is officially named after Antonio Papola, in memory of the Italian aviator died on 13 February 1948 in an air accident who had a special bond with the city. It is also officially known as "Casale" with reference to the contiguous neighborhood in Brindisi with the same name and also as "Salento Airport" with reference to the geographic region where it is located.

The strategic position of the airport in the Mediterranean region, along with its multi-modal connections with the highway and the port a few kilometers away, have made it a base of crucial importance for both national defense and NATO.

Airlines and destinations
The following airlines operate regular scheduled and charter flights at Brindisi Airport:

Statistics

UN presence

For the same strategic reasons, in 1994 the airport was chosen as the main global logistics base by the United Nations to support its peacekeeping and peace enforcement operations around the world, which was previously hosted in Pisa Military Airport "San Giusto". In 2000, the United Nations humanitarian supply depot was also moved from Pisa to Brindisi. It has since then been managed by the World Food Programme and officially known as the United Nations Humanitarian Response Depot (UNHRD). On behalf of governments, other UN agencies and NGOs, from UNHRD Brindisi humanitarian aid is directed to the most remote and devastated regions around the world.

See also
List of airports in Italy

References

External links
 
 Official website
 

Transport in Brindisi
Airports in Apulia
Buildings and structures in Brindisi